Chatyr-Tau or Chatyrtau (also Shatyor-Gora (literally the Tent Mountain) is an upland near Aznakayevo, Tatarstan, Russia, sometimes referred as an only range of Tatarstan. The highest point is 321.7 m. The range is a natural monument of Tatarstan since 1972.

See also
 List of highest points of Russian federal subjects

References

Landforms of Tatarstan
Mountain ranges of Russia
Highest points of Russian federal subjects